Cross Creek is a census-designated place located in Cross Creek Township, Washington County in the state of Pennsylvania.  The community is located in northern Washington County about 2 miles southwest of the community of Atlasburg.  As of the 2010 census the population was 137 residents.

Demographics

References

Census-designated places in Washington County, Pennsylvania
Census-designated places in Pennsylvania